Akavan Erityisalojen Keskusliitto AEK ry v Fujitsu Siemens Computers Oy (2009) C-44/08 is a European labour law case, concerning the information and consultation in the European Union.

Facts
The Dutch giant Fujitsu Siemens Computers (Holding) BV was the parent that owned subsidiary Fujitsu Siemens Computers. It had plants in Finland and Germany. On 14 December 1999, the parent directors proposed to close the Finnish factory of the subsidiary. The subsidiary consulted between 20 December 1999 and 31 January 2000. The decision to close was taken on 1 February 2000, and completed the week after. The workers claimed the decision was taken before consultation began, contrary to the Collective Redundancies Directive 98/59/EC article 2(1) which required an employer to embark upon consultations when ‘contemplating’ collective redundancies and ‘in good time’.

Judgment
The Court of Justice, Fourth Chamber, Judge Lenaerts presiding, rejected that the real decision was taken on 14 December, and that consultations should have been concluded before then. Redundancies being a mere probability were not enough. The obligation does not depend on availability of information, as information would evolve with the process. The obligation to start consulting arises irrespective of who is making the decision, but liability stays with the subsidiary.

See also

UK labour law
Codetermination

References

United Kingdom labour case law
European Union labour case law